This is a list of schools in the Roman Catholic Diocese of Jackson.

K-12 schools
Cathedral School (Natchez)
St. Joseph Catholic School (Greenville)
Vicksburg Catholic School (including St. Francis Elementary School and St. Aloysius Middle/High School) (Vicksburg)

7-12 schools
St. Joseph Catholic School (Madison)

K-8 schools
Annunciation Catholic Elementary School (Columbus)
Holy Family Elementary School (Holly Springs)
Sacred Heart Elementary School (Southaven)

Private:
Sacred Heart Elementary School (Walls) (K-8) - Was previously listed as a school of the archdiocese.

K-7 schools
St. Patrick Elementary School (Meridian)

Elementary schools
Holy Child Jesus Elementary School (Canton)
St. Alphonsus Elementary School (McComb)
St. Anthony Elementary School (Madison)
St. Elizabeth Elementary School (Clarksdale)
St. Francis of Assisi Elementary School (Greenwood)
St. Richard Catholic School (Jackson)
St. Therese Elementary School (Jackson)
Sister Thea Bowman Catholic School (Jackson)

Early childhood schools
 St. Paul Early Learning Center (Flowood, formerly Brandon)
 St. Francis of Assisi Early Learning Center (Madison)
 Holy Family Early Learning Center (Natchez)

Former schools
 Former K-12 schools
St. Gabriel Mission School (Mound Bayou) - Opened as a K-8 school on September 7, 1954. High school opened in 1958. In 1961 the high school closed. Its non-preschool grades ended in 1994.

 Former elementary schools
Our Lady of Lourdes Elementary School (Greenville) - Merged into St. Joseph in 2016
Sacred Heart Elementary School (Camden)
St. Mary Elementary School (Jackson) - Merged into Thea Bowman Elementary
Holy Family Elementary School (Natchez)

 Former preschools
 Christ the King Pre-School and Montessori (Jackson) - Merged into Bowman
 Immaculate Conception Early Childhood Center (Clarksdale)
 Saint Gabriel Early Childhood Center (Mound Bayou) - A building it used was converted to St. Gabriel Mercy Center in 1999. The early childhood center closed in 2001.

See also
 Roman Catholic Diocese of Memphis, which operates the nearest high schools to portions of Mississippi that are suburbs of Memphis

References

Education in Jackson, Mississippi
Schools
Jackson
Jackson